Sarit Hadad (born on September 20, 1978) is an Israeli singer. In October 2009, the Israeli Music TV Channel (Channel 24) named Hadad "best female singer of the 2000s". She represented Israel at the Eurovision Song Contest 2002, in Tallinn, with the song "Light a Candle".

Biography
Sarah Hudadatov (later Sarit Hadad) was born in the town of Afula, Israel to Mountain Jewish parents who had made aliyah from Dagestan in 1976. Hadad is the youngest of seven children: She has three brothers and three sisters. In 1980, her family moved to Hadera. When she was ten years old, she participated in a contest for young talent, where she performed on the piano. She also played the organ, guitar, accordion, and darbuka.

On September 21, 2017, Hadad gave birth to a baby girl named Noya.

In September 2021, she came out of the closet and revealed her partner Tamar Yahalomi, releasing the song "Ahava Kmo Shelanu" ("Love Like Ours").

Music career
Hadad comes from a musical family and was recognized as a child prodigy.  She began performing at the age of eight. Apart from classical piano, she taught herself to play the organ, guitar, accordion, and a Middle Eastern drum known as the darbuka. At the age of 15, she joined the Hadera Youth Band. When she was 16 she was discovered by Avi Gueta, who is still her manager.

Hadad's career as a pop singer has been successful, with many of her songs topping the Israeli charts. Israeli Television selected her to represent Israel in the Eurovision Song Contest 2002. The song, Nadlik Beyakhad Ner (Light A Candle) (in Hebrew: נדליק ביחד נר), came in 12th place.

In 2004, she collaborated with David D'Or to record the DVD Pets in Tunes.

In December 2006, Hadad drew crowds in New York City, Miami, and Los Angeles with her "Sing with Sarit" tour. In July 2007, Madonna revealed that she is a fan of Hadad, and enjoys listening to her music when dining at a kosher restaurant near her home.

Hadad performs Mizrahi music, often employing Arabic lyrics. She does not perform on Jewish holidays or on the Jewish Sabbath.

She  sings in English, Arabic, Georgian, Turkish, Greek and Hebrew. She was the first Israeli to perform (professionally) in Jordan.

In 2020 she did a duet with Neta Barzilai, winner of the 2018 Eurovision Song Contest.
Hadad was a judge in the inaugural season of The Voice Israel on Israeli television.

Awards and recognition
In 2010, Hadad was named Israel's Singer of the Decade.

Discography

Albums

 Spark of life – ניצוץ החיים – 1995
 Live in France – הופעה חיה בצרפת – 1996
 The Road I Chose – הדרך שבחרתי – 1997
 Singing in Arabic  – שרה בערבית – 1997
 Law of Life – חוק החיים – 1998
 Like Cinderella – כמו סינדרלה – 1999
 Live at Heichal Hatarbut – ההופעה בהיכל התרבות – 1999
 Doing What I Want – לעשות מה שבא לי – 2000
 Sweet Illusions – אשליות מתוקות – 2001
 Girl of Love – ילדה של אהבה – 2002
 Only Love Will Bring Love – רק אהבה תביא אהבה – 2003
 Celebration – חגיגה – 2004
 Miss Music – 2005 – מיס מיוזיק
 Princess of Happiness (for children) – 2006 – נסיכה של שמחה
 The One Who Watches Over Me – 2007 – זה ששומר עליי
 The Beat Collection – 2008 – האוסף הקצבי
 The Smooth Collection – 2008 – האוסף השקט
 The Race of Life – 2009 – מרוץ החיים
 The Race of Life, Live at Caesarea 2009 – 2010 – שרית חדד בקיסריה, מרוץ החיים 2009
 20 – 2011
 Days of joy – Part One – 2013 – 'ימים של שמחה – חלק א
 Sarit Hadad – 2015 – שרית חדד
 Sara Sings – 2017 -שרה שרה

Greatest hits album
The compilation – 2008 – האוסף
The Best – 2012 – המיטב

Other
Mega Mix-Like Cinderella – 1999 – מגה מיקס
Once in a Lifetime (in Bloomfield Stadium) 2014 - פעם בחיים הופעה (באצטדיון בלומפילד(

DVDs
DVD – The Show (Like Cinderella)
DVD – In the Temple (Doing What I Want)
DVD – In Caesarea (Sweet Illusions)
DVD – Child of Love (in Caesarea)
DVD – Only Love Will Bring Love (in Caesarea)
DVD – Celebration (in Caesarea)
DVD – All the Happy People (in Caesarea)
DVD – Princess of Joy (For Kids)
DVD – The Race of Life, Live at Caesarea 2009 (in Caesarea)
DVD – Once in a Lifetime (in Bloomfield Stadium)

Charts
Album

See also
 Mizrahi music
 Music of Israel

References

External links
 

1978 births
Living people
Eurovision Song Contest entrants of 2002
Eurovision Song Contest entrants for Israel
21st-century Israeli women singers
Israeli people of Dagestani-Jewish descent
Israeli people of Mountain Jewish descent
Israeli pop singers
Israeli Mizrahi Jews
People from Hadera
People from Afula
20th-century Israeli LGBT people
21st-century Israeli LGBT people
Israeli lesbian musicians
Israeli LGBT singers
Lesbian singers
Lesbian Jews